The 1938–39 National Football League was the 12th staging of the National Football League, an annual Gaelic football tournament for the Gaelic Athletic Association county teams of Ireland.

30 counties participated in the league, with Kilkenny and Fermanagh being the non-participants.

Mayo won the league for the sixth year in a row, beating Meath in the final.

Format 

There were seven groups.

Group A had originally been drawn with five teams. When Mayo entered, they were added to Group A, which was then split into two sections for the round-robin stage.

The winners of Groups A, B and C qualified automatically for the semi-final.,

The winners of Groups D, E, F and G played off for the remaining semi-final place

Results and Tables

Group A

Section One play-offs

Section Two

Group Final

Section One Table

Section Two Table

 Laois were awarded full points for their draw v Offaly, as Offaly were late fielding out.

Group B

Group C

Play-Off

Group D

Group E

Group F

Group G

Inter-group play-offs

Semi-finals

Final

Semi-finals

National League Final

References

National Football League
National Football League
National Football League (Ireland) seasons